The Air Mobile Brigade is a formation of the Sri Lanka Army which functions as a rapid deployment force using air mobility provided by the mostly Mil Mi-17s of the No. 6 Squadron of the Sri Lanka Air Force. The brigade was established in 1994 under the command of Brigadier H. N. Halangoda. Currently it is attached to the 53 Division.

Military operations undertaken 
 Operation Riviresa - 1995
 Operation Jayasikurui - 1997
 Operation Kinihira - 2000
 Operation Agnikheela - 2001
 Eastern Theater of Eelam War IV
 Northern Theater of Eelam War IV

Current Units 
 24th Battalion, Sri Lanka Light Infantry 
 12th Battalion, Sri Lanka Sinha Regiment 
 5th/7th Gemunu Watch
 3rd Battalion, Gajaba Regiment 
 1st Battalion, Vijayabahu Infantry Regiment

Past Brigade commanders 
 Brigadier Kamal Gunaratne
 Brigadier Shavendra Silva

See also
Air Mobile Brigade (disambiguation)
16 Air Assault Brigade

References

External links
Unique Character of Our Troops
The long journey to Chundikulam 

Brigades of the Sri Lanka Army
Military units and formations established in 1996
Airborne units and formations
Airborne units and formations of Sri Lanka